Clothes valet, also called men's valet, valet stand and suit stand, is a piece of furniture to hang clothes on. Clothes are hung that are worn multiple times before laundering, such as a men's suit. Typical features of valets include trouser hangers, jacket hangers, shoe bars, and a tray organizer for miscellaneous, day-to-day objects like wallets and keys.  Some also feature jewelry boxes.

Variants 
An electric clothes valet is used to warm clothes before dressing; it includes a timer to prevent overheating.

Floor-standing clothes steamers can also have a fixed clothes hanger so that they can function as a combined clothes steamer and men's valet.

A valet rod is a pipe shaped clothes valet which protrudes from a cabinet or similar, and is used as a compact clothes valet.

Other meanings 
In the United States, the term is frequently used to refer to a non-freestanding cabinet or tray for holding small personal items such as watches, cuff links, keys, or a cell phone. In this sense, it is a men's jewelry box.

Gallery

See also 
 Clothes hanger
 Clotheshorse
 Coat rack
 Clothes steamer

References 

Furniture
Domestic implements